Dominik Scherrer is a Swiss-British composer born in 1967 in Zurich, Switzerland, who has written prolifically for film, theatre and television.

Career 
Scherrer has composed the music score for both seasons of the British television series Ripper Street and worked on a third series in 2014. He won the Best Television Soundtrack Award for his work on Ripper Street at the 2014 Ivor Novello Awards.

Filmography 
The Honeytrap (2002)
 The Nine Lives of Tomas Katz (2002)
 Agatha Christie's Marple (2004–13)
 Jericho (2005)
 The Truth (2006)
 Scenes of a Sexual Nature (2006)
 Primeval (2007–09)
 Inspector George Gently (2010–11)
 Christopher and His Kind (2011)
 Just Henry (2011)
 Monroe (2011–12)
  (2012)
 Ripper Street (2012–16)
 The Missing (2014-2016)
 An Inspector Calls (2015)
 The Collection (2016)
 One of Us (2016)
 Requiem (2018)
 The City and the City (2018)
The Widow (2019)
Baptise (2019-2021)
Memory (Documentary short) (2019)
Elizabeth Is Missing (2019)
The Serpent (2021)
The Tourist (2022)

Discography 
 The Honeytrap (original soundtrack) (2007)
 Scenes of a Sexual Nature (original soundtrack) (2007)
 Monroe (original soundtrack) (2011)
 Primeval (original soundtrack) (2011)
 An Inspector Calls (original soundtrack) (2015)
 Ripper Street (original soundtrack) (2015)
 The Missing (original soundtrack) (2015)
 Requiem (original soundtrack) with Bat for Lashes (2018)
 The City and the City (original soundtrack) (2018)

Awards and nominations 
 Ivor Novello Award, Nominee Best Television Soundtrack, The Collection (2017)
 Primetime Emmy Award for Outstanding Music Composition for a Miniseries, Movie, or a Special, Nominee, The Missing (2015)
 Ivor Novello Award, Winner Best Television Soundtrack, Ripper Street (2014)
 Royal Television Society, Nominee for Best Television Soundtrack Ripper Street (2013)
 Ivor Novello Award, Nominee Best Television Soundtrack, Agatha Christie's Marple (Series 5) (2011)
 New York Festivals, Winner Best Television Soundtrack, Agatha Christie's Marple (Series 1) (2005)
 Locarno International Film Festival, Winner Prix Action Light, Hell for Leather (1998)
 International Composers Festival, Hastings and Bexhill-on-sea

References

External links
 
 

1967 births
Living people
British television composers
Swiss composers
Swiss male composers
Swiss emigrants to the United Kingdom